Donny Boaz (born December 12, 1980) is an American actor who recently portrayed the role of Chance Chancellor on The Young and the Restless.

Career 
Boaz began his career as a male model for brands such as Abercrombie, Mothers Against Drunk Driving, and runway work in Milan, Italy. However, it was a Calvin Klein underwear shoot that cost him his university scholarship just before his junior year at Southwestern Assemblies of God University because the school didn't believe it was very "Christ-like" to model men's underwear. After losing his scholarship, Boaz spent the next six years working as a model in various countries.

In 2003, he left Paris, France and returned to Dallas to pursue a career as a working actor. That same year, Boaz appeared in the "America's Sexiest Man" contest in which one of the prizes was a multi-episode role on soap opera All My Children; from that series he went to Guiding Light and appeared in several episodes.

Although he lacked formal training as an actor, he successfully auditioned for several projects, including the role of "Pfc. Patrick Miller" in the television movie Saving Jessica Lynch. He was able to use the experience of the role later on to help him get cast as "Buckley" in the television series SIX. 

In 2015, Boaz was cast as "Bill Bradley" in the film My All American where he worked with director Angelo Pizzo.

In 2019, Boaz was cast in the role of Chance Chancellor in The Young and the Restless.

In 2020, Boaz appeared in the role of James Cranbourne in the movie "When We Last Spoke"

Filmography

References

External links 
 

1980 births
21st-century American male actors
American male soap opera actors
Living people
Male actors from Dallas
People from Waxahachie, Texas